John FitzGilbert, the Marshal of the Horses ( 1105 – 1165), was a minor nobleman of supposed Anglo-Norman origin, during the reign of King Stephen, and fought in the 12th-century civil war on the side of Empress Matilda.

Life 
Beginning in 1130 and probably earlier, he had been the royal marshal to King Henry I. When Henry died, John FitzGilbert swore for Stephen and was granted the castles of Marlborough and Ludgershall, Wiltshire during this time. Along with Hamstead Marshal, this gave him control of the valley of the River Kennet in Wiltshire. He also held lands in Somerset and Berkshire, and owned some buildings in Winchester. When Empress Matilda and her supporters landed in Sussex in 1139 to press her claim for the throne, John seems to have only been a nominal supporter of Stephen. His loyalty to the king seems to have been in sufficient doubt that his castle at Marlborough was briefly besieged. When Stephen was captured at the Battle of Lincoln in 1141, John switched allegiance to Matilda. In September 1141, Matilda fled the siege of Winchester and took refuge in the Marshal's castle at Ludgershall. While covering her retreat from Winchester, John Marshal was forced to take refuge at Wherwell Abbey. The attackers set fire to the building, and John lost an eye to dripping lead from the melting roof.

In 1152, John had a celebrated confrontation with King Stephen, who had besieged him at Newbury Castle. After John had broken an agreement to surrender, Stephen threatened to kill his son, whom John had given as a hostage. John refused, saying he could make more sons, but Stephen apparently took pity on the young boy and did not kill him. The boy grew up to be William Marshal, 1st Earl of Pembroke, a legendary figure in medieval lore, and one of the most powerful men in England.

Later in his life, John briefly became entangled in the Becket controversy. Having unsuccessfully tried to assert a claim over the archbishop's land in Pagham in 1164, John then appealed to the king. Although John's claims were dubious at best, King Henry II used the affair to his advantage against Thomas Becket, who had refused to appear in person at the appeal. The resulting Council of Northampton in October 1164 led to further charges being aimed at Becket, such as embezzlement during his time as chancellor, and he would soon flee to the continent.

The office of Lord Marshal, which originally related to the keeping of the King's horses, and later, the head of his household troops, was won as a hereditary title by John, passed to his eldest son and was later claimed by William.

Family
John was the son of Gilbert, Royal Serjeant and Marshal to Henry I and his wife Matilda. After his father died in 1129, John inherited the title of King's Marshal. John married Aline Pipard, whose father Walter Pipard had been a friend of John's father. John repudiated Aline, about 1141; she subsequently married Stephen de Gay. John married (2nd) Sibyl of Salisbury, the sister of Patrick of Salisbury, who had been a local rival of his, and a supporter of King Stephen, up to that point. John had two sons by Aline Pipard—Gilbert (died 1166) and Walter (died before 1165). Walter predeceased his father and Gilbert died shortly after inheriting his father's lands.

John's eldest son by Sibyl of Salisbury, also called John Marshal (1145–1194), inherited the title of Marshal, which he held until his death. The title was then granted by King Richard the Lionheart to his second son by Sibyl, William (1147–1219), who made the name and title famous. Though he had started out as a younger son without inheritance, by the time he inherited the title his reputation as a soldier and statesman was unmatched across Western Europe. John Marshal had four sons by his second wife. As well as John and William, there were Henry (1150–1206), who went on to become Bishop of Exeter, and Anselm, who served as a knight in the household of his kinsman, Rotrou IV, Count of Perche. There were also daughters: Maud (wife of William le Gras), Margaret and Sybilla. Maud's daughter, Margaret, married Ralph de Somery, son of John de Somery and Hawise de Paynell.

References
Ancestral Roots of Certain American Colonists Who Came to America Before 1700 by Frederick Lewis Weis, Lines 55–28, 66–27, 81–28, 122A-29
Barlow, Frank. The Feudal Kingdom of England 1042-1216 London: Longman Group Limited, 1961. 
William Marshal, Knighthood, War and Chivalry 1147-1219 Longman 2002 

Specific

External links
John Marshal (David Crouch) - Oxford Dictionary of National Biography

Historical fiction
John FitzGilbert the Marshal is the subject of Elizabeth Chadwick's 2007 novel, A Place beyond Courage.
John Marshal is a prominent character in Sharon Kay Penman's 1995 novel, When Christ and His Saints Slept.

12th-century English people
1100s births
1165 deaths
English soldiers
People from Hamstead Marshall
People from Marlborough, Wiltshire
People from Newbury, Berkshire
Lord Marshals of England
High Sheriffs of Sussex
High Sheriffs of Yorkshire
English people with disabilities
Royalty and nobility with disabilities
Marshals of England